Rossica is an arts magazine published in London by Academia Rossica. The first issue of the journal appeared in 2001. 
Rossica is published on a biannual basis. The magazine covers diverse topics, such as contemporary Russian writing, the story and collection of the Moscow Tretyakov Gallery, and the disappearing architectural heritage of Moscow. It also presents recent translations of contemporary Russian literature into English.

References

External links

2001 establishments in the United Kingdom
Biannual magazines published in the United Kingdom
Cultural magazines published in the United Kingdom
Literary magazines published in the United Kingdom
Literary translation magazines
Magazines established in 2001
Magazines published in London
Visual arts magazines published in the United Kingdom